Blair Cowan (born 21 April 1986) is a Scottish rugby union player.
He plays as a number eight or flanker.

Rugby Union career

Professional career

In 2013, he signed a three-year contract with London Irish. He was granted early release from his contract ahead of the 2021–22 season in order to pursue an opportunity in Japan.

International career

In October 2013, he was named in Scotland's Squad for Autumn Internationals. Although born in New Zealand, Cowan qualifies for Scotland duty through his Scottish-born mother, who was born in the village of Blairmore near Dunoon in Argyll.
He eventually made his debut for Scotland during the 2014 summer tour of North America.

References

External links
Worcester Warriors profile
Worcester News

1986 births
Living people
Cornish Pirates players
Worcester Warriors players
London Irish players
New Zealand rugby union players
New Zealand expatriate rugby union players
New Zealand expatriate sportspeople in England
Expatriate rugby union players in England
Sportspeople from Upper Hutt
Scotland international rugby union players
Rugby union flankers
New Zealand expatriate sportspeople in Scotland
Saracens F.C. players
Black Rams Tokyo players
Rugby union players from the Wellington Region
San Diego Legion players